East African Wild Life Society (EAWLS) is a membership-based non governmental conservation organization. It was founded in 1961 following the amalgamation of the Wildlife Societies of Kenya and Tanzania (themselves both founded in 1956).

Vision
The vision of the Society is an East Africa where people enjoy the full diversity, beauty and richness of nature

Mission
The mission of the Society is to promote the conservation and wise use of the environment, especially wildlife, by advocating for rational policies and appropriate resource management regimes, in conjunction with promoting best practice and good governance.

Publications
EAWLS publishes two magazines, SWARA and the African Journal of Ecology. Both are based in Nairobi, Kenya.

External links
 East African Wildlife Society

Environmental organisations based in Kenya